In Pillay v Nagan, an important case in the South African law of succession, Nagan forged his mother's will and subsequently told people that he had done so. His siblings then approached the court to declare Nagan unworthy of inheriting. The court held that Nagan's fraudulent act was sufficient to declare him unworthy of inheriting.

See also 
 South African law of succession

Sources 
 Pillay v Nagan 2001 (1) SA 410 (D).

Law of succession in South Africa
South African case law
2001 in South African law
2001 in case law